Hijken is a village in the Dutch province of Drenthe. It is a part of the municipality of Midden-Drenthe, and lies about 13 km south of Assen, the province capital of Drenthe.

History 
The village was first mentioned in 1370 as "civibus de Hyken". The etymology is unknown. Hijken developed as an esdorp originally without a church in the Early Middle Ages as a satellite of Beilen. It used be a village of shepherds. In 1563, there were 70 sheep for every building.

Hijken was home to 417 people in 1840. In 1906, a Reformed Church was built. In 1915, a steam dairy factory which doubled as grist mill was built. Between 1928 and 1960, it was used as a Dutch Reformed church and is nowadays used by a fodder and fertilizer company. In 2018, the municipality wanted to demolished the bridge over the canal, however protests have resulted in the construction of a new bridge in 2019.

The village is also known for its surrounding Neanderthal settlements. Late Neolithic Hat graves have been discovered dating to a Bronze Age settlement near Hijken.

References

Midden-Drenthe
Populated places in Drenthe